William Collins (died 1859) was a British Whig politician

Collins was elected a Whig Member of Parliament for Warwick at a by-election in 1837—caused by the succession of Charles Canning to the peerage—and held the seat until 1852 when he did not seek re-election.

References

External links
 

UK MPs 1837–1841
UK MPs 1841–1847
UK MPs 1847–1852
Whig (British political party) MPs for English constituencies
1859 deaths
UK MPs 1835–1837